Vita Nova (meaning New Life in Latin) was a Swiss publishing house in Lucerne, Switzerland, that was established in January 1934 and co-founded by Rudolf Roessler along with the Catholic bookseller Josef Stocker and the financier Henriette Racine. It was run by Rudolf Roessler, one of the most enigmatic characters in the history of espionage. Stocker had been encouraged to help co-found the publishing firm by Jesuit and Roman Catholic priest and theological philosopher Otto Karrer. Vita Novi was an anti-Nazi publishing house that primarily published German writers in exile. Vita Nova published some fifty brochures and books that attacked both Nazism and Stalinism, contrasting them with the Christian values of the older Germany and Russia. The small firm also published books that were critical of Francoist Spain. Indeed, the firm provided the only real publishing house for exiled Christian, Catholic, Protestant and Orthodox writer and playwrights to publish their work.

References

Publishing companies of Switzerland